Zinaida Maximovna Sharko (14 May 1929 – 4 August 2016) was a Russian actress of theatre and film. She was a member of Bolshoi Drama Theatre, and was awarded People's Artist of the RSFSR in 1980.

Biography 
After the start of World War II she took part in concerts for the wounded in the hospitals, with a children's song and dance ensemble. For these concerts, a total of 900, she was awarded the medal For valorous work in the Great Patriotic War, which  always considered later would call the most expensive of its awards.

In 1951 she graduated from the Leningrad Theatrical Institute. While studying, in 1950–1951 she performed with the Leningrad regional theater, and after graduation worked at the Lenconcert Theatre (1951–1952) and at the Lensovet Theatre (1952–1956). After 1956 she had a six-decade-long career with the Tovstonogov Bolshoi Drama Theater.

Death 
She died on 4 August 2016 at the age of 87.

Selected filmography

Old Khottabych (1956) as ice cream seller
The Long Farewell (1971) as Yegenia Vasilievna Ustinova
Day of Admittance on Personal Matters (1974) as Sofia Mikhailovna
Other People's Letters (1975) as Angelina Grigoryevna Egorova
Retired Colonel (1975) as  Anastasia Petrovna
Always with Me (1976) as  Nina Romanovna
Jump from the Roof (1977) as  Ksyusha's grandmother, neighbor
The Nose (1977) as  Staff Officer Podtochina
Random Passenger (1978) as  Kamelia Nikolaevna
The Dog in the Manger (1978) as  Anarda
Autumn Story (1979) as  Nadezhda Romanovna, inspector of the City Department of Education
Sergey Ivanovich Retires (1980) as   Ksenia
Space for Maneuver (1982) as   Anna Arkadievna
Formula of Memory (1982) as   Vera Alekseevna Svetlova
Unique (1983) as   Pavlik's Mother
I Remember You (1985) as   Asya, mother of Kim and Marat
Flight of the Bird (1988) as   Iraida Stepanovna
Short Game (1990) as   Valera Dyakov's mother   
Arithmetic of a Murder (1991)  as Varvara Petrovna
Rin. The Legend of the Icon (1992)  as Apollonia, abbess
The Circus Burned Down, and the Clowns Have Gone (1998)  as Zoya Vasilievna
Composition for Victory Day (1998)  as Nina
National Security Agent (1999)  as Lyudmila Grigoryevna Petrashkul
 Bandit Petersburg 2  (2000) as  Dusya
The Garden Was Full of Moon (2000) as  Vera Andreevna
Mechanical Suite (2001) as Plyuganovsky's mother
Theatrical Novel (2003) as  Nastasya Ivanovna Koldybaeva
Russian Amazons 2 (2003) as  Olga Sergeevna
Lines of Fate (2003) as Nyura
Bad Habit (2004) as  aunt Klava
The Bet (2005) as  Tatyana Alekseevna Kuzina
Dunechka (2005) as  Dunechka's grandmother
Sonya With Golden Hands (2007) as  Manka Portovaya
Dealer (2009) as  Efrosinya Semyonovna
Behind Kefir (2013) as  old woman

References

External links

1929 births
2016 deaths
Russian film actresses
Russian stage actresses
Soviet film actresses
Soviet stage actresses
Recipients of the Order of Honour (Russia)
Actors from Rostov-on-Don
Recipients of the Nika Award
People's Artists of the RSFSR
Academicians of the Russian Academy of Cinema Arts and Sciences "Nika"
20th-century Russian actresses